102 Minutes: The Untold Story of the Fight to Survive Inside the Twin Towers, simply known as 102 Minutes, is an American non-fiction written by New York Times journalists Jim Dwyer and Kevin Flynn and published in 2005. With the aid of eyewitness testimony during the September 11 attacks, it covers firsthand accounts about the struggle to survive and escape from the twin towers of the World Trade Center.

The title is a reference to the 102 minutes which elapsed between the first impact of American Airlines Flight 11 at 8:46 am to the collapse of the North Tower at 10:28 am.

Awards and nominations
 National Book Awards – Finalist

See also

9/11: The Twin Towers (2006 BBC docudrama, also called Inside the Twin Towers)
102 Minutes That Changed America (September 11, 2008, TV special)
Hotel Ground Zero (September 11, 2009 TV movie)
The Miracle of Stairway B (2006 TV special)
 September 11 attacks
 World Trade Center (1973–2001)

References

External links
 (interactive site by The New York Times)

2005 non-fiction books
Books about the September 11 attacks